Koblenz Dorf railway station is a railway station in the Swiss canton of Aargau and municipality of Koblenz. The station is located on the Winterthur to Koblenz line of Swiss Federal Railways.

Koblenz Dorf station should not be confused with Koblenz station, which is situated rather further from the centre of Koblenz. Koblenz station is served by the same trains that serve Koblenz Dorf station, with the addition of further S27 trains between Baden and Waldshut.

Services
 the following services stop at Koblenz Dorf:

References

External links
 
 

Koblenz Dorf
Koblenz Dorf